Lupinus affinis is a species of lupine known by the common name fleshy lupine. It is native to the California Coast Ranges from the San Francisco Bay Area north, and into southern Oregon, where it is an uncommon member of the flora in several areas. It is a hairy annual herb growing  in height. The flower is purple-blue with a whitish patch on the banner.

References

External links
Jepson Manual Treatment
Photo gallery

affinis
Flora of California
Flora of Oregon